The list of universities established in the viceroyalties of the Hispanic America comprises all universities established by the Spanish Empire in Latin America from the settlement of the Americas in 1492 to the Wars of Independence in the early 19th century.

The transfer of the European university model to the overseas colonies in the Americas represented a decisive turning point in the educational history of the continents: 

The Christian mission of the Indians and the increasing demand for skilled hands in the administration of the rapidly growing colonial empire made the Spanish colonists realize the need to offer a university education on soil in the Americas. The foundation of a colonial university required, following the medieval tradition, either a papal bull (or papal brief) or a royal privilege granting the right to confer academic degrees to the students. Usually a bestowment from both clerical and secular authorities was sought and achieved. Universities were all subjected to the king's supervision, only San Nicolas in Bogotá held the status of a private university.

The new foundations modeled their charters mainly on that of the University of Salamanca, the oldest and most venerable Spanish university. The curriculum of smaller universities was confined to the artes, a kind of basic studies, and Catholic theology (plus church law). A leading role was assumed by the gradually evolving full universities which additionally offered courses in medicine and jurisprudence, thus comprising all four classic faculties. The influential first universities were founded in the colonial centers Santo Domingo, Lima and Mexico City. When it became apparent that the vast distances of the Spanish realm required a greater geographical spread of universities, they contributed to the creation of further foundations.

A key role in the development of the university system was played by the Catholic orders, especially by the Jesuits, but also the Dominicans and Augustinians. The founding and operation of most universities resulted from the – usually local – initiative of one of these orders, which sometimes quarreled openly over the control of the campus and the curriculum. The (temporary) dissolution of the Jesuit order in the late 18th century proved to be a major setback for the university landscape in Latin America, several of the suppressed Jesuit universities were reopened only decades later.

The successful export of the university, a genuine European creation, to another continent demonstrated its "extraordinary effectiveness and adaptability" as the highest educational institution and marked the beginning of its universal adoption in the modern age (see also List of the oldest universities). Yet there is no denying that at the end of the colonial era the intellectual and academic life in the younger colonial colleges of the British territories appeared more vital. Nevertheless, the Spanish colonial universities fulfilled their primary task, the education of the clerical and secular colonial elite, and could thus assume an important function in aiding the development of the young republics after the separation from the motherland.

In Portuguese Brazil, by contrast, no university existed far beyond the colonial period (the first was established as late as 1912 in Curitiba as University of Paraná). The lower local demand for theological and legal specialists was largely met by Jesuit colegios, while students aspiring to higher education had to take up studies overseas at the University of Coimbra. Instead of universities for general studies, the Portuguese favored the creation of professional academies to respond to the local needs of technicians and skilled professionals, including creating the first school of higher studies in engineering of the Americas.

List 
The list is sorted by the date of recognition. At places where more than one university was established, the name of the institution is given in brackets.

16th century

17th century

18th century

19th century

See also 
 List of universities in South America
 History of European research universities

Notes

References

Sources 
 Jílek, Jubor (ed.): "Historical Compendium of European Universities/Répertoire Historique des Universités Européennes", Standing Conference of Rectors, Presidents and Vice-Chancellors of the European Universities (CRE), Geneva 1984
 Roberts, John; Rodriguez Cruz, Agueda M.; Herbst, Jürgen: "Die Übernahme europäischer Universitätsmodelle", in: Rüegg, Walter (ed.): Geschichte der Universität in Europa. Bd. II: Von der Reformation zur Französischen Revolution (1500–1800), C. H. Beck, München 1996, pp. 213–232
 Roberts, John; Rodriguez Cruz, Agueda M.; Herbst, Jürgen: "Exporting Models", in: Ridder-Symoens, Hilde de (ed.): A History of the University in Europe. Vol. II: Universities in Early Modern Europe (1500–1800), Cambridge University Press, 1996, pp. 256–284
 Tünnermann Bernheim, Carlos: "Historia de la Universidad en América Latina. De la Época Colonial a la Reforma de Córdoba", Editorial Universitaria Centroamericana, 1991, 
 Rüegg, Walter: "Foreword. The University as a European Institution", in: Ridder-Symoens, Hilde de (ed.): A History of the University in Europe. Vol. I: Universities in the Middle Ages, Cambridge University Press, 1992, pp. XIX–XX
Guinness World Records Limited 2021.  First University in the New World. Recuperado de https://www.guinnessworldrecords.com/world-records/first-university-in-the-new-world

 Colonial Universities
 
 
 
 
Education in Latin America